Togami may refer to:

People
 , Japanese long jumper
 Ichirō Togami, Imperial Japanese Navy rear admiral
 Shunsuke Togami, Japanese table tennis player
 Masao Togami, Japanese swimmer
 Warren Togami, Hawaiian founder of Fedora Linux
 Wendy Togami, American daughter of Don Soderquist
 Masashi Togami, Japanese Lego Cuusoo winner

Fictional characters
 Dr. Sueko Togami, a research assistant portrayed by Kumi Mizuno in Frankenstein Conquers the World
 , a possessed nymphomaniac teacher in Urotsukidōji: Legend of the Overfiend
 Togami family in Ryūsei no Kizuna
 Yukinari Togami, the heir to the Togami western restaurant chain
 Masayuki Togami, Yukinari's father and the owner of the Togami western restaurant chain
 Kimiko Togami, Yukinari's mother and Masayuki's wife
 Togami family in Danganronpa
 Byakuya Togami, the "Ultimate Affluent Progeny" and agent of the Future Foundation
 Kazuya "Sagishi" Togami, the "Ultimate Imposter" who impersonates Byakuya and others
 Blue Ink / Kudan, Byakuya's biographer, who believes themselves to be Shinobu Togami
 Suzuhiko Ootsuki (né Togami), the "Ultimate Hitman" known by the codename "The Moleman"
 Orvin Elevator, an agent of the World Health Organization who purports to be the true Kazuya Togami
 Kijō (né Tarou) Togami, the former head of the Togami family and father to the 108 Togami children
 Asa, Hiru, and Yoru Togami, the triplets collectively known as the "Ultimate Weather Forecaster"
 Shinobu Togami, an emotionally unstable victim of child abuse
 Ichirou Togami, the former "Ultimate Surgeon"
 Jirou Togami, the unstable "Ultimate Karate Master"
 Takaya Togami, the intelligent "Ultimate Agitator"
 Yuusuke Togami, the alcoholic former "Ultimate Gourmet"
 Asagao Togami, an incredibly depressed, outwardly nice person
 Mitsuzou Togami, a vain, cowardly person known for "using people"
 Eyumi Togami, a gloomy but perceptive warmonger and war profiteer
 Saburou Togami, a reclusive and heavyset pervert
 Wasuke Togami, a sniveling but determined gossip
 Shirou Togami, an observant musician

Literature
 Danganronpa Togami, a light novel written by Yuya Sato
 Togami, a fictional western restaurant chain in Ryūsei no Kizuna

Japanese-language surnames